In the Unix shells ksh, bash, fish and zsh, the disown builtin command is used to remove jobs from the job table, or to mark jobs so that a SIGHUP signal is not sent to them if the parent shell receives it (e.g. if the user logs out).

See also
nohup, a POSIX command to ignore the HUP (hangup) signal

External links
 Bash Reference Manual: Job Control Builtins
 The Z Shell Manual: 17. Shell Builtin Commands
 Fish's disown command

System administration